Gore is a settlement in the Municipality of Hrastnik in central Slovenia. The area is part of the traditional region of Styria. It is now included with the rest of the municipality in the Central Sava Statistical Region.

Name
The name of the settlement was changed from Sveti Jurij ob Turju (literally, 'Saint George next to Turje') to Gore (literally, 'mountains') in 1955. The name was changed on the basis of the 1948 Law on Names of Settlements and Designations of Squares, Streets, and Buildings as part of efforts by Slovenia's postwar communist government to remove religious elements from toponyms.

Church

The local church is dedicated to Saint George and belongs to the Parish of Hrastnik. It dates to the early 16th century.

References

External links
Gore on Geopedia

Populated places in the Municipality of Hrastnik